Tony Dale Galbreath  (born January 29, 1954) is a former American football running back in the National Football League (NFL) for the New Orleans Saints, the Minnesota Vikings, and the New York Giants. He played college football at the University of Missouri and was drafted in the second round of the 1976 NFL Draft.

Galbreath was an All-Big Eight running back for the Missouri Tigers in 1974. He was elected team captain for the 1975 season and still ranks among the Tigers' all-time leading rushers, despite the fact that he played just two years of football after transferring from Indian Hill (Iowa) Junior College. 

Galbreath was a rookie in 1976 with the New Orleans Saints and was part of the "Thunder and Lightning" backfield, along with Saints' first round pick Chuck Muncie. Galbreath quickly became one of the top pass-catching running backs in the NFL. As a rookie, he was the NFL's sixth leading receiver. In 1978, his third season with the Saints, he finished second in the NFL in receiving. He played with the Saints for five seasons, and when he left the Saints, he ranked second in all-time rushing yards for the team. 

Galbreath was traded to the Minnesota Vikings in 1981. He played three years for the Vikings, primarily as a pass-catching back and blocker. Galbreath went to the New York Giants in 1984, essentially fulfilling the same role. He played four seasons with the Giants, including the 1986 season in which the Giants won the Super Bowl (Super Bowl XXI), as Galbreath was the team's second leading receiver. He retired after the 1987 season as the most prolific pass-catching running back in NFL history.

Galbreath was enshrined in the University of Missouri Athletics Hall of Fame in 1995. Galbreath was enshrined in the New Orleans Saints Hall of Fame in 1991. In 2013, he was enshrined in the Missouri Sports Hall of Fame. Galbreath's family resides in Fulton.

References

1954 births
Living people
People from Fulton, Missouri
American football running backs
University of Missouri alumni
Missouri Tigers football players
New Orleans Saints players
Minnesota Vikings players
New York Giants players